Automobili Stanguellini was an Italian maker of small sports cars, based in Modena and founded by Vittorio Stanguellini; it was most active between 1946 and 1960. They continued to produce  competition cars until 1981, when Vittorio Stanguellini died; thenceforth, the company devoted to vintage cars.

History
The Stanguellini family had a long involvement with the motor car. Vittorio's grandfather founded an engineering company in 1879, and his father was the first one in Modena to register a car (in 1910, registration "MO 1"). "By the time Vittorio took over, in 1929, the family business included a FIAT agency.

Vittorio Stanguellini began tuning and modifying Maserati, Alfa Romeo and Fiat cars for racing. He was a friendly rival of Enzo Ferrari in Modena beginning in the late 1920s. Vittorio then formed Squadra Corse Stanguellini in 1938 and quickly found success when he modified a Maserati 6CM which took the overall victory at the 1938 Targa Florio.

Racing

Stanguellini's cars competed in countless sports car racing events, minor and major (such as the 1957 24 Hours of Le Mans) alike. Vittorio Stanguellini used his experience tuning Fiats in the pre-war days, and having raced them under the Squadra Stanguellini flag, he based his small racers on Fiat components. Focusing on the 750 & 1100 cc classes (winning numerous National victories), Stanguellini sports cars were beautifully engineered cars with light-alloy cylinder blocks, twin overhead camshafts (bialbero) and dual side-draught Weber carburettors.

Unlike many other of the so-called "Etceterinis", Stanguellini were loath to use foreign parts, instead relying on Fiat as much as possible. Bodywork was usually by local Carrozzeria Reggiano.

Vittorio Stanguellini tried very hard to gain a  win at the 24 Hours of Le Mans. However, with his limited resources, he never was able to achieve this. His best finish was a fourth in class.

The Stanguellini 750cc Racing Engine

Vittorio Stanguellini had been making special aluminium twin-cam cylinder heads for the Fiat 1100 block since 1947. However, in 1950 he finished his most ambitious project: a complete 750cc racing engine - designed from a clean sheet of paper by Oberdan Golfieri, an engineer from Romagna, Italy. This was a light weight 9000 rpm engine based on a specially cast aluminium block and heads. Stanguellini racing cars achieved extraordinary success worldwide with this engine in the 1950s, including numerous national championships in Italy and France. Briggs Cunningham purchased a 750cc twin-cam car which he raced in the United States, along with a Stanguellini Formula Junior (See below).

Major race wins

Mille Miglia 750cc class wins in 1938 and 1940
Mille Miglia 1100cc class win in 1940
Targa Florio 750cc class wins in 1938 & 1952
12 Hours of Sebring class win in 1957

A Stanguellini won the Vanderbilt Cup in 1960 at the Roosevelt Raceway, New York. The Vanderbilt Cup was run as a Formula Junior race in 1960.

Road cars

In 1947, a Bertone bodied four-seat berlinetta was offered, using familiar Fiat 1100 parts in a tubular chassis. This was also offered with a 1,500 cc engine. A Fiat 750-based two-seater was offered up the following year.

In the early 1970s Stanguellini built a series of chassis for Peter Kalikow's Momo Mirage GT coupe.

World speed records

In 1963, Stanguellini completed a single-seat streamliner called the "Colibrì" (Italian for hummingbird), powered by a 250 cc Moto Guzzi motorcycle racing engine. This car set six international speed records at the Autodromo Nazionale Monza in 1963.

Formula Junior

Stanguellini single-seaters, "scaled-down lookalikes of the famous Maserati 250F" powered by Fiat 1100 engines, were competitive in Formula Junior, a category under Formula One that existed between 1958 and 1963. Stanguellini won the first season of the Italian Formula Junior championship, and "famous drivers like Bandini and von Trips won their first races in Stanguellinis." Walt Hansgen won the FJ race at the inaugural United States Grand Prix meeting at Sebring, Florida, on December 12, 1959, driving a Stanguellini.

More than 100 Formula Juniors were built by Stanguellini, and they were very successful until 1960 and the arrival of British mid-engined racers like the Cooper and Lotus. As the days of the Fiat 1100-based, front-engined racers were over, Stanguellini did develop a mid-engined car called the Delfino for the 1962 season. The Delfino debuted at Daytona 1962 in the hands of the Cunningham team's Walt Hansgen and started on pole. It retired with technical problems and the design was never fully competitive again. After 1966, the Stanguellini family concentrated their efforts on tuning equipment and subcontract design, while also running their Modena Fiat dealership.

See also

Bandini Automobili
Siata
O.S.C.A.
List of Italian companies

References

External links

 Company history at RitzSite
 Official website
 English-language website

Car manufacturers of Italy
Defunct motor vehicle manufacturers of Italy
Italian racecar constructors
Formula Junior cars
1879 establishments in Italy
1981 disestablishments in Italy
Italian automotive pioneers
Sports car manufacturers
24 Hours of Le Mans teams